James Tupper (born August 4, 1965) is a Canadian actor known for his roles as Jack Slattery on the ABC television series Men in Trees, Dr. Chris Sands on the NBC medical drama series Mercy, and David Clarke on ABC's Revenge. He also starred in the post-apocalyptic thriller Aftermath, on Space in Canada and Syfy in the U.S., and in the HBO series Big Little Lies.

Early life

Tupper was born in Dartmouth, Nova Scotia. He studied acting at Concordia University, Montreal, and later at Rutgers University in New Jersey, where he earned a master's degree.

Career

Tupper acted in several off-Broadway plays, including An Actor Prepares and After the Rain. He co-wrote and appeared in 2005's Loudmouth Soup, a fully improvised independent film that was filmed in one night with no script and no second takes.

In 2006, Tupper started portraying Jack Slattery in the ABC series Men in Trees, credited for all 36 episodes of the show's run. He then appeared as Dr. Chris Sands in the NBC medical drama Mercy for 22 episodes before it was cancelled in 2010.

Tupper appeared as Dr. Andrew Perkins, a trauma counselor, on ABC's Grey's Anatomy. He appeared in seven episodes in the show's seventh season.

Tupper appeared on ABC's Revenge from 2011 to its cancellation in 2015. He portrayed the character of David Clarke, the supposedly deceased father of the main character. His character had a recurring role for the first three seasons, appearing only in flashbacks and videos. Tupper was promoted to main cast for season four after it was revealed in the season three finale that his character was still alive.

On September 27, 2016, the British Columbia, Canada-produced post-apocalyptic action thriller Aftermath debuted on Canada's Space network and on America's Syfy network. While starring in this series, his real-life partner Anne Heche played his wife for the series. In addition to his acting role on the series, Tupper also served as co-producer. The freshman season's 13-episode run ended in December 2016; the series was not renewed.

Personal life
Tupper split from his wife, Kate Mayfield, in November 2006; they were still married as of early 2009. He began dating actress Anne Heche in 2007, they met on the set of “Men in Trees” and went on to co-star in the 2008 film “Toxic Skies”.  Their son was born in March 2009. They split in January 2018.

Filmography

Film

Television

References

External links

James Tupper Bio 5

1965 births
Living people
Canadian male film actors
Canadian male television actors
People from Dartmouth, Nova Scotia
Concordia University alumni
Rutgers University alumni
male actors from Halifax, Nova Scotia
21st-century Canadian male actors